Saint-Urcize is a commune in the Cantal department in south-central France.

Population

See also
Communes of the Cantal department

References

Communes of Cantal
Auvergne
Cantal communes articles needing translation from French Wikipedia